Ikan bakar is an Indonesian and Malay dish, prepared with charcoal-grilled fish or other forms of seafood. Ikan bakar literally means "grilled fish" in Indonesian and Malay. Ikan bakar differs from other grilled fish dishes in that it often contains flavorings like bumbu, kecap manis, sambal, and is covered in a banana leaf and cooked on a charcoal fire.

Origin and popularity
Grilling is one of the oldest and earliest cooking methods to prepare fish. Freshwater fish and seafood are among the main source of protein intake for the inhabitants of the archipelago. Naturally, this method is immensely popular and quite widespread in the maritime realm of Indonesian archipelago. Thus the grilled-barbecued fish is regarded as a classic dish of Indonesian cuisine.

As an archipelagic nation, ikan bakar is very popular in Indonesia, commonly found in many places; from an Acehnese beach right down, a restaurant perched over Kupang's harbour in East Nusa Tenggara, to the center of Jakarta's business district. Various specific version exist, including as Sundanese ikan bakar Cianjur, which mainly grilled freshwater fish, such as carp and gourami, and Balinese ikan bakar Jimbaran, freshly grilled seafood fish in warungs clustered near Jimbaran beach and fishmarket in Bali. The barbecued seafood however, is especially popular in eastern Indonesia region; Sulawesi and Maluku where most of the people work as fishermen, and both areas have a vast sea which brings them different kind of seafood. Usually, the fish is marinated with mixture of spices pastes, and sometimes with belacan or kecap manis (sweet soy sauce) and then grilled; sometimes protected with a sheet of banana leaf placed between the seafood and grill to avoid the fish being stuck to the grill and broken to pieces.

Marination and spices 

The fish is usually marinated with a mixture of sweet soy sauce and coconut oil or margarine, applied with a brush during grilling. The spice mixture may vary among regions and places, but usually it consists of a combination of ground shallot, garlic, chili pepper, coriander, tamarind juice, candlenut, turmeric, galangal and salt. In Java and most of Indonesia, ikan bakar usually tastes rather sweet because the generous amount of sweet soy sauce either as marination or dipping sauce. It is commonly consumed with steamed rice and the sweet sticky soy sauce poured over finely chopped green chilies and shallots. While the ikan bakar of Minangkabau (Padang), most of Sumatra and also Malay peninsula, usually more spicier and yellow-reddish in colour because the generous amount of chili pepper, turmeric and other spices, and the absence of sweet soy sauce.

Ikan bakar is usually served with sambal belacan (chili with shrimp paste) or sambal kecap (sliced chilli peppers and shallot in sweet soy sauce) as dipping sauce or condiment and slices of lemon as garnishing. The East Indonesian Manado and Maluku ikan bakar usually uses rica-rica, dabu-dabu or colo-colo condiment.

Variants 

There are many variants of ikan bakar, differ from the recipes of marinate spices, dipping sauces or sambals, to the species of fishes being grilled. Almost all kinds of fish and seafood can be made into ikan bakar, the most popular are freshwater gourami, patin (pangasius) and ikan mas (carp), to seafood tongkol or cakalang (skipjack tuna), bawal (pomfret), tenggiri (wahoo), kuwe (trevally), baronang (rabbitfish), kerapu (garoupa), kakap merah (red snapper), and pari (stingray). Some of the popular forms of seafood besides fish include sotong (squid), and udang (shrimp).

Tradition

Indonesia

Enjoying ikan bakar on a beach is a popular culinary itinerary during a visit to popular Indonesian tourism destinations; such as Jimbaran beach in Bali, Losari beach in Makassar, and Muara Karang harbor in Jakarta.
 
In Indonesia, ikan bakar might be consumed any day throughout the year. However, in recent years, barbecuing fish and grilling corn cobs has grown to become a tradition on celebrating New Year's Eve. Ikan bakar and jagung bakar has become a New Year's barbecue party essentials among Indonesians.

See also 

 Ikan goreng
 Pecel Lele
 List of fish dishes

References

External links 

 Ikan Bakar recipe
 Sweet Soy Roasted Fish (Ikan Bakar) Recipe

Indonesian cuisine
Malaysian cuisine
Malay cuisine
Fish dishes
Indonesian seafood dishes